Austin Ekeler (born May 17, 1995) is an American football running back for the Los Angeles Chargers of the National Football League (NFL). He played college football at Western Colorado and signed with the Chargers as an undrafted free agent in 2017.

Early years

Ekeler attended Eaton High School in Eaton, Colorado, where he played high school football for The Fightin' Reds.

College career
Ekeler attended and played college football at Western Colorado from 2013 to 2016.

As a freshman, Ekeler started nine games. He led the team with 1,049 rushing yards to go along with seven rushing touchdowns. As a sophomore, he had 14 rushing touchdowns and set school records with 1,676 rushing yards, 2,093 total all-purpose yards, and 190.3 all-purpose yards per game. As a junior, he had 19 rushing touchdowns and led Division II in all-purpose yards per game with 203.9 and scoring, averaging 12.6 points per game. As a senior, he had 1,495 rushing yards and 15 rushing touchdowns.

College career statistics

Professional career

Ekeler signed a three-year, $1.66 million contract that includes a $5,000 signing bonus with the Los Angeles Chargers as an undrafted free agent following the 2017 NFL Draft.

In March 2020, Ekeler, as a restricted free agent running back, agreed to a 4-year, $24.5 million deal. The contract includes $15 million guaranteed. Ekeler can become a free agent after the 2023 season.

2017
In the season opening 24–21 loss to the Denver Broncos on Monday Night Football, Ekeler had two receptions for 18 yards in his NFL debut. In Week 4, against the Philadelphia Eagles, he had his first career touchdown, a 35-yard rush, on his first NFL carry. On November 12, against the Jacksonville Jaguars, he had 10 carries for 42 yards to go along with five receptions for 77 receiving yards and two touchdowns. Overall, he finished his rookie season with 260 rushing yards, two rushing touchdowns, 27 receptions, 279 receiving yards, and three receiving touchdowns.

2018
In the 2018 season opener against the Kansas City Chiefs, Ekeler had 39 rushing yards to go along with five receptions for 87 receiving yards and a receiving touchdown in the 38–28 loss. He scored a receiving touchdown in Weeks 4 and 5 against the San Francisco 49ers and Oakland Raiders. In Week 14, against the Cincinnati Bengals, he aggravated a neck injury, which sidelined him for two games. He returned for the regular season finale against the Denver Broncos and scored a rushing touchdown. Overall, in the 2018 season, he finished with 554 rushing yards, three rushing touchdowns, 39 receptions, 404 receiving yards, and three receiving touchdowns. The Chargers earned the #5-seed for the AFC Playoffs. In the Wild Card Round against the Baltimore Ravens, he had 43 scrimmage yards in the 23–17 victory. In the Divisional Round against the New England Patriots, he had three receptions for 19 yards in the 41–28 loss.

2019
Ekeler began the season as the starter while Melvin Gordon was in a contract dispute. In Week 1, Ekeler rushed 12 times for 58 yards and the game-winning touchdown, in addition to catching six passes for 96 yards and two touchdowns in the 30–24 overtime win over the Indianapolis Colts. In Week 2 against the Detroit Lions, he rushed 17 times for 66 yards and a touchdown with additional work in the receiving game, recording six receptions for 67 in the team's 10–13 loss to the Lions. In Week 3 against the Houston Texans, Ekeler rushed nine times for 36 yards and caught seven receptions for 45 yards. In Week 4 against the Miami Dolphins, Ekeler rushed 18 times for 60 yards and one touchdown and caught five passes for 62 yards and one touchdown in the 30–10 win. During Week 7 against the Tennessee Titans, Ekeler had only seven rushing yards but had 118 receiving yards as the Chargers lost 20–23. In Week 11 against the Kansas City Chiefs on Monday Night Football, Ekeler rushed five times for 24 yards and caught eight passes for 108 yards in the 24–17 loss. During Week 14 against the Jacksonville Jaguars, Ekeler finished with 101 rushing yards on just eight carries, with four receptions for 112 receiving yards, and a touchdown as the Chargers won 45–10. He was the sixth player ever, and the first since Herschel Walker in 1986, to average over 10 yards per carry and reception in a 100/100 game. Overall, he finished the 2019 season with 557 rushing yards and three rushing touchdowns to go along with 92 receptions for 993 receiving yards and eight receiving touchdowns.

2020
On March 16, 2020, Ekeler signed a four-year $24.5 million contract extension with the Chargers. In Week 2 against the Kansas City Chiefs, Ekeler rushed 16 times for 93 yards and caught 4 passes for 55 yards during the 23–20 overtime loss. In Week 3 against the Carolina Panthers, Ekeler recorded 143 yards from scrimmage and a rushing touchdown during the 21–16 loss. In Week 4, Ekeler suffered a hamstring injury and a hyperextended knee and was expected to miss four to six weeks. He was placed on injured reserve on October 9, 2020. He was activated on November 28, 2020. Ekeler made his return from injury in Week 12 against the Buffalo Bills. During the game, he recorded 44 rushing yards and 85 receiving yards during the 27–17 loss. In Week 14 against the Atlanta Falcons, he recorded 146 yards from scrimmage during the 20–17 win. Ekeler finished the 2020 season with 116 carries for 530 rushing yards and one rushing touchdown to go along with 54 receptions for 403 receiving yards and two receiving touchdowns.

2021

In Week 4, against the Las Vegas Raiders, Ekeler had 15 carries for 117 rushing yards, one rushing touchdown, and one receiving touchdown in the 28–14 victory. The following week, against the Cleveland Browns, Ekeler had 119 scrimmage yards, two rushing touchdowns, and one receiving touchdown in the 47–42 victory. In Week 11, against the PIttsburgh Steelers, he had 115 scrimmage yards, two rushing touchdowns, and two receiving touchdowns in the 41–37 victory. Ekeler tallied 206 attempts for 911 rushing yards and 12 rushing touchdowns to go along with 70 receptions for 647 receiving yards and eight receiving touchdowns. Ekeler had eight games going over 100 yards from scrimmage. With 20 total touchdowns, Ekeler joined Hall of Fame running back LaDainian Tomlinson as the only two players in Chargers franchise history to score that many touchdowns in a single season. Ekeler, along with Colts running back Jonathan Taylor, led the NFL in touchdowns. Ekeler was ranked 46th by his fellow players on the NFL Top 100 Players of 2022.

2022
In Week 4, against the Houston Texans, Ekeler had 109 scrimmage yards, two rushing touchdowns, and one receiving touchdown in the 34–24 victory. In Week 5, against the Cleveland Browns, he had 16 carries for 173 rushing yards and one rushing touchdown to go along with a receiving touchdown in the 30–28 victory. In Week 16, against the Indianapolis Colts, he scored two rushing touchdowns. With those two scores, Ekeler and Marshall Faulk are the only two players in NFL history to have 10 or more rushing touchdowns and five or more receiving touchdowns in consecutive seasons. In Week 17, against the Los Angeles Rams, Ekeler rushed for 122 yards and had 39 receiving yards and two touchdowns, including a career-long 72-yard run, earning AFC Offensive Player of the Week.

NFL career statistics

Regular season

Postseason

Records and achievements

NFL records 

 One of four players in 15 years to score at least 15 touchdowns in back-to-back seasons.
 Along with Marshall Faulk, Ekeler is one of two players in NFL history to have 10 or more rushing touchdowns and five or more receiving touchdowns in consecutive seasons.
 Along with Priest Holmes, Ekeler is one of two players in NFL history to be an undrafted player with 1,500 scrimmage yards and 15 touchdowns in consecutive seasons.
 Most catches by a running back in a single season in Chargers history.

Personal life 
Austin Ekeler's younger brother, Wyett Ekeler, plays football at the University of Wyoming. His mother is Suzanne Ekeler.

In 2021, Austin Ekeler started the Austin Ekeler Foundation with the mission is "to help create opportunities for people to fulfill their passions and ultimately their lives." Also in 2021, Ekeler started the Gridiron Gaming Group as a way for sports personalities to grow their online communities while livestreaming their gaming with other athletes.

References

External links

 Los Angeles Chargers bio
 Western State Colorado Mountaineers bio
 Austin Ekeler Foundation

1995 births
Living people
African-American players of American football
American football running backs
Los Angeles Chargers players
People from Weld County, Colorado
Players of American football from Colorado
Western Colorado Mountaineers football players
21st-century African-American sportspeople